The 2021 Saitama Seibu Lions season is the 71st season of the franchise in Nippon Professional Baseball, their 42nd season in Saitama, under Seibu Group, and playing at the MetLife Dome. It was the team's 4th season under manager Hatsuhiko Tsuji, who has managed the Lions for 4 years. The Lions, for the 2nd year in a row, failed to qualify for the playoffs, going all the way down in last place.

Regular season 
The Lions finished in 6th place, going 55-70-18, with a .440 winning percentage. This is the 2nd year in a row the Lions failed to qualify for the playoffs.

References

Saitama Seibu Lions seasons
2021 Nippon Professional Baseball season